Yisroel Tzvi Neuman (born April 1947 in Baltimore, to his parents Jaye and Sarah (nee Silverman)) is an Orthodox rabbi and one of the four roshei yeshiva (deans) of Beth Medrash Govoha (the Lakewood Yeshiva) in Lakewood, New Jersey. He shares this post with Rabbi Malkiel Kotler, Rabbi Yerucham Olshin, and Rabbi Dovid Schustal. He is married to the daughter of Rav Dov Schwartzman, who is a granddaughter of the founder of the yeshiva, Rabbi Aharon Kotler.

He was a student of Rabbi Binyamin Steinberg at the Talmudical Academy in Baltimore.

References

American Haredi rabbis
Rosh yeshivas
Beth Medrash Govoha
People from Lakewood Township, New Jersey
Living people
1947 births
Rabbis from New Jersey